Thomas Tarlton Brown (September 21, 1860 – October 25, 1927) was an Anglo-American center fielder in Major League Baseball. Born in Liverpool, Lancashire, England, son of William Henry Tarlton Brown and Mary Nixon Lewis, he played for 17 seasons, a career in which he batted .265 while scoring 1,524 runs with 1,958 hits. Upon his retirement he served as an umpire, working mostly in the National League in 1898 and 1901–1902.

Career
In June , Tom signed with the Baltimore Orioles, of the American Association, as a non-drafted free agent. As a right fielder, he hit one home run with 23 runs batted in for that season with Baltimore. He was a right fielder for most of his early career, switching over to center later in his career. That year, the Orioles finished 6th in the league, and Brown was sent to the Columbus Buckeyes in an unknown transaction before the  season. He played two seasons in Columbus, both of which he hit five home runs and drove in 32 runs.

On October 30, 1884, the Buckeyes went under and the team, with all of its players, were purchased by the Pittsburgh Alleghenys for a sum of $8,000. He was picked up by the Indianapolis Hoosiers, of the National League, a few days later, where he hit only .179 in 36 games. While at Indianapolis, Brown became part of the first known platoon arrangement in baseball, as he split time with right-handed hitting Gid Gardner.

Before the  season, he was sent to the Boston Beaneaters. Brown was one of Boston's star players. As their starting right fielder he hit nine home runs with 49 RBIs, and stole 46 bases. After the 1888 season, Albert Spalding assembled two teams of players for a baseball world tour with Tom pitching for the "All America" team. The tour lasted until March 1889. For the  season, he only hit two home runs, and drove in 24 runs, but placed third in the league with 63 stolen bases. He also scored 93 runs while only accumulating 84 hits.

Brown jumped to the new Players' League, along with many other major league players, before the  season. The league lasted just one season, and Tom signed with the Boston Reds. In that season with the Reds, he hit .274 with 4 home runs and 61 RBIs, and stole 79 bases. Behind Brown's hitting prowess, and with other star such as Dan Brouthers, Hugh Duffy, and Charlie Buffinton, the Reds finished first in the league.

After the 1891 season, the Association folded, Brown was granted to the league and was later obtained by the Louisville Colonels on January 1, 1892. On January 6, 1895, he was traded to the St. Louis Browns for shortstop Frank Shugart. Brown played in 83 games for St. Louis before being released in August. He signed with the Washington Senators on August 21, 1895.

Career records
Brown established the major league record with 490 errors committed as an outfielder. He racked up 222 errors in the American Association, 238 in the National League, and 30 in the Player's League. By contrast, the National League record is held by nineteenth-century player George Gore with 346 errors and the American League record by Ty Cobb with 271.

Other baseball capacities
After his retirement early in the 1898 season, he became an umpire and finished the season in the National League, umpiring a total of 96 games that year. During his time umpiring, he ejected seven players from games, three of which were in 1898. On September 30, Philadelphia Phillies second baseman Nap Lajoie was sent to the bench after a heated argument, insisting Brown is crooked. Nap was suspended for three days. The following season, in  he only umpired two games before becoming manager of the  minor league Springfield Ponies in the Eastern League.

Post baseball career
Tom was predeceased by his wife, Christine, and his daughter, Ethel May Brown Stratton. In later life he owned a tobacco store on M Street in Washington, DC. Tom died in Washington, D.C. at the age of 67, and is interred at the Fort Lincoln Cemetery in Brentwood, Maryland.

See also
List of Major League Baseball career triples leaders
List of Major League Baseball career runs scored leaders
List of Major League Baseball career stolen bases leaders
List of Major League Baseball annual stolen base leaders
List of Major League Baseball annual runs scored leaders
List of Major League Baseball annual triples leaders
List of Major League Baseball player-managers

References

External links

Major League Baseball center fielders
19th-century baseball players
Baltimore Orioles (AA) players
Columbus Buckeyes players
Pittsburgh Alleghenys players
Indianapolis Hoosiers (NL) players
Boston Beaneaters players
Boston Reds (PL) players
Boston Reds (AA) players
Louisville Colonels players
St. Louis Browns (NL) players
Washington Senators (1891–1899) players
Major League Baseball players from the United Kingdom
Major League Baseball players from England
English baseball players
National League stolen base champions
Washington Senators (NL) managers
English emigrants to the United States
Sportspeople from Liverpool
1860 births
1927 deaths
Minor league baseball managers
San Francisco Eagles players
San Francisco Athletics players
San Francisco Nationals players
Portsmouth Riversides players
Los Angeles Seraphs players
Springfield Ponies players
Denver Grizzlies (baseball) players
Washington Senators (1891–1899) managers
Major League Baseball player-managers